Chesham Town Football Club were an English football club from Chesham, Buckinghamshire.

Chesham and Waterside FC was founded by Rev Reade, curate of Christ Church, Chesham in 1879.  The first game was against Amersham in October 1879. In 1894 they became founder members of the Southern League. They were renamed Chesham Town in 1899 and continued to play in the Southern League until 1904, when they finished 11th and bottom of the table. They re-entered the Southern League in 1908 but left four years later to become founder members of the Athenian League. They left that league in 1914 and in 1917 merged with Chesham Generals to form Chesham United, who are still in existence.

References

Chesham United F.C.
Chesham
Defunct football clubs in England
Association football clubs established in 1894
Association football clubs disestablished in 1917
Southern Football League clubs
Defunct football clubs in Buckinghamshire
Athenian League
1894 establishments in England
1917 disestablishments in England